— also known as  — is a well-known Son Huasteco or Huapango song from Mexico, which has been covered more than 200 times by recording artists.

The song is that of a man telling a woman (from Málaga, Spain) how beautiful she is, and how he would love to be her man, but that he understands her rejecting him for being too poor.

 is attributed to Elpidio Ramírez and Pedro Galindo, published by Peer International in 1947 (monitored by BMI), although Mexican composer Nicandro Castillo questions the validity of that authorship. As he mentions:

Many have recorded and played this song, in particular Tríos huastecos, Mariachis and Bolero Trios. But the most famous version was made by Miguel Aceves Mejía with his mariachi. With Huapangos or Son Huastecos, the falsetto technique is used to great effect, as in David Záizar's version. Quite a few versions of the song feature vocal gymnastics by whoever sings them, particularly the stretching of vowels such as the "e" sound in the gentilic 'Malagueña' for as long as the singer can hold the note. Other known mariachi versions of the song were recorded by: 
Antonio Aguilar
Angela Aguilar
Antonio Aguilar and Joselito
Ramón Vargas
Miguel Aceves Mejía
Mariachi Vargas
David Záizar.

Tríos huastecos that have played this song include:
Los Camperos de Valles
Trio Chicontepec
Trio resplandor huasteco

Bolero trio versions were recorded by:
Los Panchos
Los Tres Ases
Rafael Méndez on his album Mendez and Almeida Together

This song became known internationally and has been recorded by such artists as:

 Nancy Ames on her 1969 all Spanish album "This Is The Girl That Is".
 Avenged Sevenfold released a version of the song in 2017 Avenged Sevenfold – Malagueña Salerosa, adding metal elements to the song.
 Alla Bayanova was recorded in Romania in 70 years on long-playing record. She sang this song in Romanian. 
 Ray Boguslav in 1961 on the album Curfew shall not ring tonightRay Boguslav – Curfew Shall Not Ring Tonight – MF359
 Bomba Estéreo
 Luiz Bonfá on his 1966 album "The Brazilian Scene"
 Bud & Travis on their 1959 album Bud and Travis.
 Los Caballeros
 Tex-mex band Chingón recorded it for the 2004 soundtrack of Kill Bill: Volume 2 Kill Bill 2 Soundtrack – Malaguena Salerosa. They also performed it live – YouTube. 
 In the opening title sequence of the movie Once Upon a Time in Mexico, Antonio Banderas is seen "playing" on guitar a version of Malagueña Salerosa, recorded by Chingon, members of group Del Castillo of Austin, Texas and director/producer/editor Robert Rodriguez, with orchestral backing.
 Chitãozinho & Xororó in 2006 on their album Vida Marvada
 The Italian band El Cuento de la Chica y la Tequila recorded "Malagueña Salerosa" on their 2013 EP The Wounded Healer.
 Carol Cisneros
 Plácido Domingo on his 1999 album , which won a Grammy Award for Best Mexican-American Performance PLACIDO DOMINGO LA MALAGUENA SALEROSA.
 José Feliciano (who performed both this song and Malagueña by Ernesto Lecuona.)
 The Iranian singer Googoosh.
 John Gary, American vocalist, sang it on the 1967 albums "Spanish Moonlight" and "Carnegie Hall Concert."
 The Texan folksinger Tish Hinojosa sang it on her 1991 album Aquella Noche
 Harry James on his 1966 album The Ballads And The Beat! (Dot DLP 3669 and DLP 25669).
 Yugoslav and Montenegrin singer Nikola Karović recorded "Malagueña" in 1964 as a single album, and it sold more than 1 million copies.
 Kathy Kirby, whose 1963 UK hit (#17) "You're the One" set English lyrics, by Marcel Stellman, to the melody of "Malagueña Salerosa".
 The Limeliters on their 1960 album The Limeliters.
 Trini Lopez on his 1964 album The Latin Album, however, wasn't released as a single until 1968.
 Helmut Lotti in 2000 on the album Latino Classics.
 Paco de Lucía on his 1967 album 
 Lydia Mendoza
 Gaby Moreno performed it on A Prairie Home Companion in 2016 La Malagueña – Gaby Moreno | Live from Here with Chris Thile. 
 Nana Mouskouri on her 1998 album .
 Estela Nuñez on her 1972 album .
 Eddie Palmieri on his 1998 album El Rumbero del Piano.
  recorded it in Polish in 1959
 Anna German, Poland
 Juan Reynoso
 Cowboy music group Riders in the Sky on their 1994 album Cowboys in Love and their 2003 album Riders in the Sky Silver Jubilee
 Popular Filipino singer Victor Wood, who was dubbed during the 1970s as a Jukebox King along with fellow singer Eddie Peregrina made the song popular in the Philippines.
 Românticos de Cuba, Brazil
 Ronstadt Generaciones y los Tucsonenses
 The French singer Olivia Ruiz in 2003 on her album , and then again on her 2008 Spanish-language album .
 Pablito Ruiz
 Sandler and Young
 The Croatian singer Massimo Savić in 1988 on his album  (Magic Words).
 Trio Los Angeles in 1973, reaching the Dutch pop charts. It was produced by Hans Vermeulen and played by the band Sandy Coast.
 The Tubes performed La Malagueña on their eponymous 1975 album debut.
 Caterina Valente, who also performed Malagueña by Ernesto Lecuona.
 The Iranian singer Viguen who sang La Malagueña in Persian. He has a Spanish version as well.
 James Booker on the posthumous album "Spiders On The Keys: Live At The Maple Leaf".
 Four Jacks a danish vocal quartet, released a cover version in 1960
 French Latino on the album Suerte, 2013
 The Brothers Comatose & Mariachi Oliveros 2022 – YouTube
 Angela Aguilar (granddaughter of Antonio Aguilar & daughter of Pepe Aguilar) 2021

Notes and references

External links 
Lyrics
Lyrics with composers credits

Spanish-language songs
The Tubes songs
Avenged Sevenfold songs
1947 songs